Joseph Sweda (January 3, 1926 – April 1, 2015) was an American farmer and politician.

Born in Lublin, Wisconsin, Sweda went to Withee High School and then served in the United States Army Air Forces during World War II. Sweda was a farmer and had a business with his brothers hauling gravel and wood products. He served as chairman of the Roosevelt Town Board, on the Taylor County, Wisconsin Board of Supervisors, on the fire district board, and was a Democrat. Sweda served in the Wisconsin State Assembly from 1963 to 1974. He was appointed Wisconsin Highway Commissioner and later was Wisconsin Transportation Commissioner. Sweda died in Thorp, Wisconsin.

Notes

1926 births
2015 deaths
People from Taylor County, Wisconsin
Businesspeople from Wisconsin
Farmers from Wisconsin
Military personnel from Wisconsin
United States Army Air Forces personnel of World War II
Mayors of places in Wisconsin
County supervisors in Wisconsin
20th-century American businesspeople
Democratic Party members of the Wisconsin State Assembly